Meckel-Gruber syndrome is a rare, lethal ciliopathic genetic disorder, characterized by renal cystic dysplasia, central nervous system malformations (occipital encephalocele), polydactyly (postaxial), hepatic developmental defects, and pulmonary hypoplasia due to oligohydramnios.
Meckel–Gruber syndrome is named for Johann Meckel and Georg Gruber.

Pathophysiology

Meckel–Gruber syndrome (MKS) is an autosomal recessive lethal malformation. Recently, two MKS genes, MKS1 and MKS3, have been identified. A study done recently has described the cellular, sub-cellular and functional characterization of the novel proteins, MKS1 and meckelin, encoded by these genes. The malfunction of this protein production is mainly responsible for this lethal disorder.

Relation to other rare genetic disorders 

Recent findings in genetic research have suggested that a large number of genetic disorders, both genetic syndromes and genetic diseases, that were not previously identified in the medical literature as related, may be, in fact, highly related in the genetypical root cause of the widely varying, phenotypically-observed disorders.  Thus, Meckel–Gruber syndrome is a ciliopathy.  Other known ciliopathies include primary ciliary dyskinesia, Bardet–Biedl syndrome, polycystic kidney and liver disease, nephronophthisis, Alström syndrome, and some forms of retinal degeneration.
The MKS1 gene has been identified as being associated with a ciliopathy.

Diagnosis
Dysplastic kidneys are prevalent in over 95% of all identified cases. When this occurs, microscopic cysts develop within the kidney and slowly destroy it, causing it to enlarge to 10 to 20 times its original size. The level of amniotic fluid within the womb may be significantly altered or remain normal, and a normal level of fluid should not be criteria for exclusion of diagnosis.

Occipital encephalocele is present in 60% to 80% of all cases, and post-axial polydactyly is present in 55% to 75% of the total number of identified cases. Bowing or shortening of the limbs are also common.

Finding at least two of the three phenotypic features of the classical triad, in the presence of normal karyotype, makes the diagnosis solid. Regular ultrasounds and pro-active prenatal care can usually detect symptoms early on in a pregnancy.

Management
There is no cure to the disease. Treatment is symptomatic and to make the baby as comfortable as possible.

Prognosis 
The disease is lethal. Most infants that are not stillborn with Meckel syndrome die within hours to days of birth. The longest survival time reported in medical literature is 28 months.

Incidence
While not precisely known, it is estimated that the general rate of incidence, according to Bergsma, for Meckel syndrome is 0.02 per 10,000 births. According to another study done six years later, the incidence rate could vary from 0.07 to 0.7 per 10,000 births.

This syndrome is a Finnish heritage disease.  Its frequency is much higher in Finland, where the incidence is as high as 1.1 per 10,000 births. It is estimated that Meckel syndrome accounts for 5% of all neural tube defects there. The Leicestershire Perinatal Mortality Survey for the years 1976 to 1982 had found high incidences of Meckel syndrome in Gujarati Indian immigrants.

References

External links 

Autosomal recessive disorders
Ciliopathy
Congenital disorders of nervous system
Congenital disorders of digestive system
Congenital disorders of urinary system
Rare syndromes
Diseases named for discoverer